In geometry, the sagitta (sometimes abbreviated as sag) of a circular arc is the distance from the center of the arc to the center of its base. It is used extensively in architecture when calculating the arc necessary to span a certain height and distance and also in optics where it is used to find the depth of a spherical mirror or lens. The name comes directly from Latin sagitta, meaning an arrow.

Formulae
In the following equations,  denotes the sagitta (the depth or height of the arc),  equals the radius of the circle, and  the length of the chord spanning the base of the arc.
 
This may be rearranged to give any of the other three:
 

Approximation
When the sagitta is small in comparison to the radius, it may be approximated by the formula

Alternatively, if the sagitta is small and the sagitta, radius, and chord length are known, they may be used to estimate the arc length by the formula

where  is the length of the arc; this formula was known to the Chinese mathematician Shen Kuo, and a more accurate formula also involving the sagitta was developed two centuries later by Guo Shoujing.

Applications
Architects, engineers, and contractors use these equations to create "flattened" arcs that are used in curved walls, arched ceilings, bridges, and numerous other applications.

The sagitta also has uses in physics where it is used, along with chord length, to calculate the radius of curvature of an accelerated particle. This is used especially in bubble chamber experiments where it is used to determine the momenta of decay particles. Likewise historically the sagitta is also utilised as a parameter in the calculation of moving bodies in a centripetal system. This method is utilised in Newton's Principia.

See also
 Circular segment
 Versine

References

External links
 Calculating the Sagitta of an Arc

Architectural terminology
Geometric measurement